Sharafa may refer to:
 Şərəfə, Azerbaijan
 Sharafa, Ardabil, Iran
 Sharafa, East Azerbaijan, Iran